The Archives and Mausolea Department (書陵部 Shoryō-bu) is a division of the Imperial Household Agency of Japan.

The department is headed by a Director-General and consists of the following divisions:

 Archives Division
 Compiling
 Imperial Mausolea and Tombs, such as Musashi Imperial Graveyard

The headquarter is at the Tokyo Imperial Palace. In addition, there are five regional offices at Tama, Momoyama, Tsukinowa, Unebi and Furuichi

External links 
 Imperial Household Agency | Archives and Mausolea Department

Imperial Household Agency